Quinnipiac Bobcats ice hockey may refer to either of the ice hockey teams that represent Quinnipiac University:

 Quinnipiac Bobcats men's ice hockey
 Quinnipiac Bobcats women's ice hockey